Necrocarcinidae is an extinct family of Late Jurassic and Cretaceous crabs. It comprises 40 species grouped in seven genera.

Genera
Genera within this family include:
 Corazzatocarcinus Larghi, 2004
 Cristella Collins and Rasmussen 1992
 Necrocarcinus Bell, 1863
 Paranecrocarcinus Van Straelen, 1936
 Polycnemidium Reuss, 1859
 Pseudonecrocarcinus Förster, 1968
 Shazella Collins & Williams, 2004

References 

Crabs
Decapod families
Prehistoric crustacean families